is a Japanese anime director. Nanba started working in the anime industry in 1982 and directed his first full series in 1989. Since then, some of the series he has directed include Heroman, Gosick, and Golden Kamuy.

Biography
Hitoshi Nanba was born in Niigata Prefecture. He started working in the anime industry in 1982 and was put in charge of directing for the first time with Dash! Yonkuro in 1989. Following Dash! Yonkuro, he directed the anime adaptation of Gosick in 2011. In 2018, he was put in charge of the anime adaptation of Golden Kamuy.

Works

TV series
 Dash! Yonkuro (1989–1990) (director)
 Jungle King Tar-chan (1993–1994) (director)
 Bonobono (1995–1996) (director)
 YAT Anshin! Uchū Ryokō (1996–1998) (director)
 Baki the Grappler (2001) (part 1 director)
 Heroman (2010) (director)
 Gosick (2011) (director)
 Our Love Has Always Been 10 Centimeters Apart (2017) (chief director)
 Golden Kamuy (2018–2020) (director)
 I-Chu: Halfway Through the Idol (2021) (director)
 Tomo-chan Is a Girl! (2023-present) (director, storyboard artist)

Films
 Fate/Grand Order: First Order (2016) (director)
 Fate/Grand Order: Moonlight/Lostroom (2017) (director)

Original video animation
 Hajime no Ippo: Mashiba vs Kimura (2003) (director)

References

External links
 

Anime directors
Japanese film directors
Japanese storyboard artists
Japanese television directors
Living people
People from Niigata Prefecture
Year of birth missing (living people)